James Maxell Mitchell (born August 11, 1999) is an American football tight end for the Detroit Lions of the National Football League (NFL). He played college football at Virginia Tech.

Early life and high school
James Mitchell was born August 11, 1999, to Jimmy and Marcia Mitchell. Mitchell's father is the pastor at Cave Church in Norton, Virginia, and has long done the Lord's work, while his mother played basketball and got an Ivy League education at Brown University.  Mitchell grew up in Big Stone Gap, Virginia and attended Union High School where he was a stand out athlete in multiple sports. Mitchell's athleticism was noticed at an early age when he began dunking the ball in middle school while playing JV basketball.   He committed to play college football at Virginia Tech over offers from Georgia, Duke and Clemson.

College career
Mitchell played in 13 games, primarily on special teams, as a freshman. He became a starter as a sophomore and caught 21 passes for 361 yards with two touchdowns. Mitchell had 26 receptions for 435 yards and four touchdowns as a junior. Mitchell considered entering the 2021 NFL Draft, but opted to stay at Virginia Tech for his senior season. Mitchell was named to the Pre-season All-ACC team prior to his senior year and was on the Mackey Award watch list. Mitchell suffered a season-ending injury in the second game of his senior year. Following the end of the season, he announced that he would be entering the 2022 NFL Draft.

Professional career

Mitchell was selected in the fifth round with the 177th overall pick of the 2022 NFL Draft by the Detroit Lions.

On November 6, 2022, Mitchell recorded his first NFL touchdown on a 3-yard reception against the Green Bay Packers at Ford Field.

References

External links
 Detroit Lions bio
Virginia Tech Hokies bio

1999 births
Living people
Players of American football from Virginia
People from Big Stone Gap, Virginia
American football tight ends
Virginia Tech Hokies football players
Detroit Lions players